The 2009 MTV Movie Awards were presented on Sunday, May 31, 2009, at the Gibson Amphitheatre in Universal City, California. Andy Samberg served as host for the 18th annual ceremony.

Performers 
 Eminem — "We Made You" and "Crack a Bottle"
 Kings of Leon — "Use Somebody"

Presenters 
Anna Faris and Chris Pine — presented Breakthrough Female
Michael Bay and Megan Fox — introduced an exclusive Transformers: Revenge of the Fallen sneak preview
Shia LaBeouf — presented Best Fight
Bradley Cooper, Ed Helms, Justin Bartha, and Taraji P. Henson — introduced Eminem
Jonah Hill and Vanessa Hudgens — presented Breakthrough Male
Sacha Baron Cohen as Bruno Gehard — presented Best Male Performance
Daniel Radcliffe, Rupert Grint, and Emma Watson — introduced an exclusive Harry Potter and the Half-Blood Prince sneak preview
Sandra Bullock and Ryan Reynolds — presented Best Kiss
Big Pak and Hayden Panettiere — presented Best WTF Moment
Leighton Meester and Lil' Wayne — presented Best Song From a Movie
Robert Pattinson, Kristen Stewart, and Taylor Lautner — introduced an exclusive The Twilight Saga: New Moon sneak preview
Kiefer Sutherland, Triumph the Insult Comic Dog, and Zac Efron — presented the MTV Generation Award
Cameron Diaz, Sofia Vassilieva, and Abigail Breslin — presented Best Female Performance
Sienna Miller and Channing Tatum — introduced Kings of Leon
Danny McBride and Will Ferrell — presented Best Comedic Performance
Denzel Washington — presented Best Movie

Awards

MTV Generation
 Ben Stiller

Notable moments 
 Brüno, a flamboyant gay character played by Sacha Baron Cohen, staged a stunt with Eminem in which he was "flying" overhead in the theatre toward the stage to present the award for Best Male Performance. Baron Cohen was dressed as an angel, and he was wearing only a jockstrap underneath his costume. In mid-flight, he was lowered upside-down from the rafters after an apparent problem with his wire harness. This caused him to land directly on top of Eminem in such a way that Baron Cohen's fully exposed buttocks area was positioned directly in Eminem's face. An apparently incensed Eminem angrily shouted "You serious?" and "Are you fuckin' serious?!" and then "Get this motherfucker off me!", demanding that his bodyguards and members of D12 remove Baron Cohen from atop him. After they aggressively shoved Baron Cohen away while he was still suspended in the air, Eminem and his entourage stormed out of the theater immediately. Baron Cohen then announced the winner of the Best Male Performance award (Zac Efron for High School Musical 3: Senior Year) while still hanging from harness wires above the audience. Eminem and Baron Cohen later claimed the event was staged and had been rehearsed extensively. Eminem claimed that after he "stormed" out of the theatre he went back to his hotel room and "laughed uncontrollably for about three hours". However, while the prank is widely accepted as being staged - at least on Baron Cohen's part - commentators have questioned as to how much (if at all) Eminem truly was in on the joke.
 Heath Ledger's performance as The Joker in The Dark Knight earned the actor a posthumous award for Best Villain.
 Kiefer Sutherland jokingly broke down in tears while presenting the MTV Generation Award to Ben Stiller.

Sneak Peeks 
Transformers: Revenge of the Fallen
Harry Potter and the Half-Blood Prince
The Twilight Saga: New Moon

References

External links 
 
 MTV Movie Awards official site
 "Lil Wayne and Will Ferrell Announced as MTV Movie Awards Presenters"

 2009
Mtv Movie Awards
MTV Movie Awards
2009 in Los Angeles
2009 in American cinema
2009 awards in the United States